Clarence Raymond Adams (April 10, 1898 – October 15, 1965) was an American mathematician who worked on partial difference equations.

He entered Brown University in the fall of 1915 and graduated in 1918. Adams received his PhD in 1922 from Harvard University under the direction of G. D. Birkhoff. On August 17, 1922, he married Rachel Blodgett, who earned a PhD from Radcliffe College in 1921. As a Sheldon Traveling Fellow of Harvard University, he studied at the Sapienza University of Rome under Tullio Levi-Civita and at the University of Göttingen under Richard Courant. In 1923 Adams returned to Brown University as an instructor, then became a full professor in 1936 and eventually chair of the mathematics department from 1942 to 1960. In 1965 he retired and died on October 15 of that same year.

Publications

References

External links

 Author profile in the database zbMATH
 

1898 births
1965 deaths
Place of death missing
20th-century American mathematicians
Mathematical analysts
Brown University alumni
Harvard University alumni
Brown University faculty
Mathematicians from Rhode Island